Agonopterix ordubadensis is a moth of the family Depressariidae. It is found in Armenia and Russia.

References

Moths described in 1959
Agonopterix
Moths of Europe